A private community is a residential community that can be an association or a proprietary organization. Associations can include condominiums, homeowner associations or cooperatives. 

Whereas governmental communities are financed with taxation, where taxes typically have little connection with benefits, private communities' benefits are financed by payments from its members.  In a hotel, for example, the public goods such as elevators and security are paid for from room charges.

One early American example was Lucas Place, created in 1851 in St. Louis, Missouri, the first of about 50 such private places unique to the city. Today, there are "60 million people who now live in roughly 300,000 private communities" in the United States.

A noteworthy Canadian example, Arbutus Ridge Seaside Community for Active Adults in the Cowichan Valley on Vancouver Island was the first comprehensive retirement community built in Canada. It subsequently became the template and proving ground for the now accepted and commonplace age-restricted community.

See also
 Voluntary community
 Proprietary community
 Gated community
 Planned community
 Community settlement (Israel)
 Spencer Heath, whose goal was to have cities and large land areas owned by single private owners, which would rent out the land and housing and provide all conceivable public services
 Spencer H. MacCallum

References

Social groups
Types of communities
Planned residential developments